Asaf Hanuka (born 1974) is an Israeli illustrator and comic book artist, notable for his autobiographical comic The Realist. He is twin brother of illustrator Tomer Hanuka.

Career
During his mandatory army service he began collaborating with Israeli writer Etgar Keret. In 1997 a collection of Etgar's stories illustrated by Asaf was publish under the title "Streets of Rage". Their second collaboration "Pizzeria Kamikaze" was nominated for Eisner awards in 2007 and translated to English, French and Spanish.

He collaborated with French writer Didier Daeninckx on "Carton Jaune!" in 2004 Published in France.

Together with his twin brother Tomer, he co-created Bipolar, an experimental comic book series which was nominated for the Ignatz awards.
Tomer and Asaf have created together “The Dirties”, a short narrative available on line. 
They currently collaborate on a graphic fiction called The Divine, written by Boaz Lavie, released in 2015 in both English and French.

Asaf also contributed art for the Oscar-nominated war documentary animation film Waltz with Bashir.

His autobiographical comics The Realist started in January 2010, published in Calcalist (Israeli business magazine). It won a Gold medal from the Society of Illustrator in 2010 and Award of Excellence from Communication Arts Annual, and silver medal from 3X3. Two collections of The Realist pages were published in book form in France in 2012 and 2014, and have been translated into six languages.

He has been practicing commercial illustration since 1995. Among his clients are Nike, Inc., Canal+, Rolling Stone, Fortune, The New York Times, Time, The Wall Street Journal, Forbes, PC Magazine, Newsweek, and Men’s Health.

Published works
In English
 Bipolar, with Tomer Hanuka, Alternative Comics,
 Pizzeria Kamikaze, with Etgar Keret, Alternative Comics, 2005, .

In Hebrew
 Simtaot Hazaam (Streets of Fury), by Etgar Keret, Zmora Bitan, 1997.
 The Realist, Pardes Publishing, 2017.
In French
 Carton Jaune!, with Didier Daeninckx, (publisher) Hachette 2004
 K.O. a Tel Aviv collection of The Realist comics strips, (publisher) Steinkis 2012
 K.O. a Tel Aviv 2 second collection of The Realist comics strips, (publisher) Steinkis 2014
 K.O. a Tel Aviv 3 third collection of The Realist comics strips, (publisher) Steinkis 2016
 Le Divin, with Tomer Hanuka, story by Boaz Lavie, Dargaud, 2015

References

External links
 Asaf Hanuka.com – Official website
 The Realist autobiographical comics

Israeli illustrators
Israeli twins
Living people
1974 births
Israeli caricaturists
Israeli cartoonists
Israeli comics artists
People from Tel Aviv